The 11029/11030  Koyna Express is one of 3 daily dedicated express trains belonging to Indian Railways that run between Mumbai and Kolhapur in India. It operates as train number 11029 from Mumbai CSMT to Kolhapur SCSMT and as train number 11030 in the reverse direction. 
The other two daily trains on the Mumbai and Kolhapur run are 11023/24 Sahyadri Express & 17411/12 Mahalaxmi Express.

This train is named after the Koyna river that flows across Maharashtra.

Coaches

The 11029/11030 Koyna Express presently has 2 AC Chair Car, 5 2nd Class seating & 9 General Unreserved coaches.

As with most train services in India, coach composition may be amended at the discretion of Indian Railways depending on demand.

Service

The 11029 Koyna Express covers the distance of 518 kilometres in 11 hours 45 mins (44.09 km/hr) & 12 hours 45 mins as 11030 Koyna Express (40.89 km/hr).

Traction

It is a total diesel haul end to end. Usually a WDP-4D locomotive from Pune Shed or a WDM-3D twins from the Electric Loco Shed, Kalyan haul the train.

Timetable

11029 Koyna Express leaves Mumbai CSMT every day at 08:40 hrs IST and reaches Kolhapur SCSMT at 20:35 hrs IST the same day.

11030 Koyna Express leaves Kolhapur SCSMT every day at 07:55 hrs IST and reaches Mumbai CSMT at 20:35 hrs IST the same day.

See also
 Mahalaxmi Express
 Sahyadri Express

References

External links
11029 Koyna Express Time Table
11030 Koyna Express Time Table

Named passenger trains of India
Rail transport in Maharashtra
Transport in Kolhapur
Express trains in India